Bipolar disorder not otherwise specified (BD-NOS) is a diagnosis for bipolar disorder (BD) when it does not fall within the other established sub-types.  Bipolar disorder NOS is sometimes referred to as subthreshold bipolar disorder.

Classification 
BD-NOS is a mood disorder and one of four subtypes on the bipolar spectrum, which also includes bipolar I disorder, bipolar II disorder, and cyclothymia. BD-NOS was a classification in the DSM-IV and has since been changed to Bipolar "Other Specified" and "Unspecified" in the 2013 released DSM-5 (American Psychiatric Association, 2013).

Diagnosis 
Bipolar disorder is difficult to diagnose. If a person displays some symptoms of bipolar disorder but not others, the clinician may diagnose bipolar NOS.  The diagnosis of bipolar NOS is indicated when there is a rapid change (days) between manic and depressive symptoms and can also include recurring episodes of hypomania.  Bipolar NOS may be diagnosed when it is difficult to tell whether bipolar is the primary disorder due to another general medical condition, such as a substance use disorder.

Treatment 
Individual approaches to treatment are recommended, usually involving a combination of mood stabilizers and atypical antipsychotics. Psychotherapy may be beneficial and should be started early.

Epidemiology
The prevalence of BD-NOS is 1.4%.

See also

References

External links 

Bipolar disorder
Bipolar spectrum